Benjamin Faville DuBois, Jr. (November 2, 1915 – January 7, 2013) was an American banker and politician.

Born in Sauk Centre, Minnesota, DuBois served in the United States Army and United States Navy. DuBois was a banker and worked at the First State Bank of Sauk Centre. He also worked for the Minnesota Banking Department. From 1941 to 1946, DuBois was the postmaster of Sauk Centre. From 1963 to 1969, he served in the Minnesota House of Representatives and was a Democrat. DuBois died in his native Sauk Centre, Minnesota, aged 97, and was survived by two daughters.

References

1915 births
2013 deaths
People from Sauk Centre, Minnesota
Harvard Business School alumni
Businesspeople from Minnesota
Democratic Party members of the Minnesota House of Representatives
Minnesota postmasters
20th-century American businesspeople